Ángel Roberto Amarilla Lezcano (born 27 July 1981) is a Paraguayan former professional footballer who played as a central defender.

Football career
Born in Eusebio Ayala, Amarilla was signed by Valencia CF in the summer of 1999, being hailed as of one of the biggest promises in his country after playing as a 17-year-old for Atlético de Rafaela, which led his agent Eduardo Gamarnik trying to find a club for him in Europe. He was initially assigned to the B-team.

On 21 November 2000 Amarilla made his first – and only – official appearance for the main squad, with coach Héctor Cúper fielding him in a 2–0 home win against SK Sturm Graz for the season's UEFA Champions League second group stage. Released by the Che in June 2006 after several loans, he resumed his career in the Spanish lower leagues, mainly with UD Alzira and mostly in the Valencian Community.

Honours

Club
Cerro Porteño
Paraguayan Primera División: 2004

Alzira
Tercera División: 2007–08

Sant Andreu
Segunda División B: 2009–10

References

External links

Stats and bio at CiberChe 
Stats at Resultados de Fútbol 

1981 births
Living people
Paraguayan footballers
Association football central defenders
Club Olimpia footballers
Atlético de Rafaela footballers
Racing Club de Avellaneda footballers
Segunda División players
Segunda División B players
Tercera División players
Valencia CF Mestalla footballers
Valencia CF players
Getafe CF footballers
CD Badajoz players
UD Alzira footballers
UE Sant Andreu footballers
Huracán Valencia CF players
Cerro Porteño players
Paraguayan expatriate footballers
Expatriate footballers in Argentina
Expatriate footballers in Spain
Paraguayan expatriate sportspeople in Spain
People from Cordillera Department